James Pearce (1805–1862) was a U.S. Senator from Maryland from 1843 to 1862. Senator Pearce may also refer to:

Bill Pearce (politician) (1894–1968), Florida State Senate
Charles H. Pearce (1817–1887), Florida State Senate
David Pearce (politician) (born 1960), Missouri State Senate
Drue Pearce (born 1951), Alaska State Senate
Monty Pearce (born 1948), Idaho State Senate
Russell Pearce (born 1947), Arizona State Senate

See also
Senator Peirce (disambiguation)
Senator Pierce (disambiguation)